The 1993 Ivy League Baseball Championship Series took place at Palmer Field in Middletown, Connecticut on May 8, 1993.  It was the first season that the Ivy League sponsored baseball after Army and Navy departed the Eastern Intercollegiate Baseball League, and as such the first year of the Championship Series.  The series matched the regular season champions of each of the league's two divisions.  , the winner of the series, claimed their first title and the Ivy League's automatic berth in the 1993 NCAA Division I baseball tournament.

Results

References

Ivy League Baseball Championship Series
Ivy League Baseball Championship Series
Ivy League Championship Series